Live at the Cafe (also titled as Live at the Cafe: Back in the Day) is a 2000 live album by the Washington, D.C.-based musician Little Benny.

Track listing

"Lay It on Down" – 2:55
"What's My Name?" – 3:15
"Ladies Go Bop Bop" – 6:03
"Ten for Ten" – 0:46
"Whoa" – 5:12
"Camay – 6:29
"Take Me Out to the Go Go" – 6:53
"Roll Call" – 4:54
"Benny's Socket" – 0:43
"What You Want Me to Do" – 7:21
"Bojak" – 1:46
"Hit Me With the 1, 2" – 2:19
"Thong Song (Go Go Thongs) – 7:18
"Practice Makes Perfect" – 4:51
"It's So Hard" – 10:36

Personnel
Roy Battle – keyboards
Bojak – percussion
Larnell "Whitney" Carr – percussion
Charles "Corleone" Garris – vocals
Anthony "Lil Benny" Harley – trumpet, vocal
Mark Lawson – keyboards
Darien Towns – bass guitar

References

External links
Live at the Cafe at Discogs

2000 live albums
Anthony Harley albums